Everything We Loved is a 2014 New Zealand drama film written and directed by Max Currie. It won Best Actress and Best Screenplay at the 2014 New Zealand Film Awards.

Plot

Cast
 Brett Stewart ... Charlie Shepherd
 Sia Trokenheim ... Angela Shepherd
 Ben Clarkson ... Tommy Burroughs
 Patrick Garbett ... Hugo
 Simon Dallow ... Newsreader

Awards

References

External links

2014 films
2014 drama films
New Zealand drama films
Films set in New Zealand
Films shot in New Zealand
Films directed by Max Currie
2010s English-language films